Shepherd Field Air National Guard Base is the home base of the West Virginia Air National Guard 167th Airlift Wing located at the Eastern West Virginia Regional Airport, 4 miles south of Martinsburg, West Virginia.

Environmental issues
 the U.S. Air Force has been investigating whether industrial chemicals have seeped from the 167th Airlift Wing base into the groundwater. 

In August 2014, the Air Force had found 10 areas where aqueous film forming foam may have entered the soil including "a former fire-training area, three hangars, two buildings, a fire-truck testing area, two storage areas and a wastewater-treatment area". The military seeks to determine if the compounds are present, and if they seeped into the groundwater.

The Eastern West Virginia Regional Airport is in the Big Springs wellhead-protection area for the city's water supply.

See also
West Virginia National Guard

References

Installations of the United States Air National Guard
Martinsburg, West Virginia
West Virginia Air National Guard
Military installations in West Virginia